Dasht-e Pirgheyb (also Romanized as Dasht-e Pīrgheyb) is a village in Fasarud Rural District, in the Central District of Darab County, Fars Province, Iran. At the 2006 census, its population was 408, in 88 families.

References 

Populated places in Darab County